Platygyriella jamaicensis is a species of moss belonging to the genus Platygyriella. It was discovered in Jamaica in 1936 by E.B. Bartram It has branches with a size length of about 1-1.5 cm (0.4-0.6 in). It has leaves with the length of about 1.4 mm. with an erect top, straight edges, and curved below. It has perichaetal erect leaves (different from the other leaf) spreading, plant with 4–6 mm. leaves, with are very smooth and thin with an oblong-cylindrical, which can reach up to 1.4 mm. It has a basilar crown with are 15-20 μm and yellow.

References

Hypnaceae
Plants described in 1928
Taxa named by Edwin Bunting Bartram